The Domon Ken Award (土門拳賞, Domon-Ken-shō) is one of Japan's photographic awards.

The award was started in 1981 by the Mainichi Newspapers to mark the 110th birthday of the Mainichi Shimbun, its daily newspaper and main publication, in honor of the photographer Ken Domon. It has been awarded every year since 1982.

The Domon Ken Award is given to a single established photographer for a published book of documentary photographs. Together with sample photographs, an announcement is made in Sunday Mainichi (and previously in Camera Mainichi as well). Award-winning works are shown in the Ginza Nikon Salon and the Domon Ken Photography Museum.

The major rival to this award for attention in the mass media is the Kimura Ihei Award, given annually to one or more newcomers.

Winners

Notes

External links
 List of award winners with links to their books at an online bookstore.

Awards established in 1981
Japanese awards
Photography awards
Photography in Japan
1981 establishments in Japan